General Sir Harry Beauchamp Douglas Baird  (4 April 1877 – 2 July 1963) was a British officer in the British Indian Army.

Early life and education
Baird was born in Kensington, London, the son of Scottish Colonel Andrew Wilson Baird and Margaret Elizabeth Davidson. He was educated at Clifton College and the Royal Military College, Sandhurst.

Military career
Baird was commissioned on the unattached list of the Indian Army on 20 January 1897. He served on the Western Front in World War I becoming commanding officer of the 1st/8th Battalion the Argyll and Sutherland Highlanders in 1916 and then as a General Staff Officer first with 51st (Highland) Division and then with the Cavalry Corps before becoming commander of 75th Infantry Brigade in 1918.

After the War Baird became a General Staff Officer at 4th Indian Infantry Division in India, Brigadier-General on the General Staff with the Baluchistan Force and then commanding officer of the 28th Punjabis. He then became Commander of the Zhob Brigade in November 1920, Colonel on the Staff at Army Headquarters, India in 1923 and Commandant of the Senior Officers' School, Belgaum in 1924.

Baird went on to be Deputy Adjutant and Quartermaster-General in India in July 1929 and General Officer Commanding the Kohat District in December 1930. Then he became General Officer Commanding the Deccan District in 1932 and General Officer Commanding-in-Chief Eastern Command in April 1936 before retiring in April 1940.

References

Bibliography

External links
Generals of World War II

 

|-
 

1877 births
1963 deaths
British Indian Army generals
Knights Commander of the Order of the Bath
Companions of the Order of St Michael and St George
Companions of the Order of the Star of India
Companions of the Distinguished Service Order
Graduates of the Royal Military College, Sandhurst
People from Kensington
Indian Army generals of World War II
Indian Army personnel of World War I
Commandants of the Senior Officers' School, Belgaum
People educated at Clifton College
Military personnel from London
British people in colonial India